Boris Tišma (born 20 February 2002) is a Croatian professional basketball player for Split of the Croatian League and ABA League

Early life and youth career
Tišma grew up playing basketball for Croatian club Dubrava. In 2015, he signed with Real Madrid in Spain and joined its youth academy. He chose Real Madrid over offers from many other clubs, including Cedevita. Tišma learned to speak Spanish after a few months at Real Madrid, with teammate Luka Dončić helping him adjust.

Professional career
On 12 January 2020, Tišma made his professional debut for Real Madrid at the age of 17 years and 11 months. He played 44 seconds in an 87–72 win over Estudiantes in the Liga ACB. On 8 March, Tišma scored his first points, recording two in a 92–70 victory over Zaragoza.

In February, 2021, Tišma was loaned to Real Betis for the rest of the season. Following the 2020–21 season Tišma declared for the 2021 NBA draft.

On 7 July 2021, Tišma signed a multi-year deal with KK Studentski centar (later SC Derby) of the Prva A Liga and the ABA League. On July 19, 2021, he withdrawn his name from consideration for the 2021 NBA draft.

In December, 2022, Tišma moved to Split signing a contract to last until 2025.

National team career
Tišma represented Croatia at the 2017 FIBA U16 European Championship in Podgorica, where his team finished in fourth place.
He won a gold medal at the 2018 FIBA U16 European Championship in Novi Sad and was named to the all-tournament team after averaging 18 points, five rebounds and 2.7 assists per game. He led all scorers with 24 points in a 71–70 win over Spain in the final.

Personal life
Both of Tišma's parents, Danijela (née Bakić) and Miodrag Tišma, are former basketball players.

References

External links
FIBA profile
proballers.com profile
RealGM profile
Real Madrid profile

Living people
2002 births
ABA League players
Croatian men's basketball players
Basketball players from Zagreb
Croatian expatriate basketball people in Spain
Real Madrid Baloncesto players
KK Studentski centar players
Small forwards
Real Betis Baloncesto players
KK Split players